Strothe is a small river of Lower Saxony, Germany. It branches off the Lohne and flows into the Grawiede near Diepholz. Lohne and Grawiede are both tributaries of the Hunte.

See also
List of rivers of Lower Saxony

Rivers of Lower Saxony
Rivers of Germany